Emília Rotter (8 September 1906 in Budapest, Hungary – 28 January 2003) was a Hungarian pair skater.

With partner László Szollás she won the World Figure Skating Championship four times in five years (1931, 1933, 1934, and 1935), and were the 1932 World silver medalists.  They were the 1934 European Champions and 1930 & 1931 silver medalists. They represented Hungary at the 1932 Winter Olympics and at the 1936 Winter Olympics, winning two bronze medals.

Rotter was Jewish, and was inducted into the International Jewish Sports Hall of Fame in 1995.

Competitive highlights
(with Szollás)

See also
 List of select Jewish figure skaters

References 

 Pairs on Ice profile

Navigation

1906 births
2003 deaths
Hungarian female pair skaters
Figure skaters at the 1932 Winter Olympics
Figure skaters at the 1936 Winter Olympics
Olympic figure skaters of Hungary
Olympic bronze medalists for Hungary
Figure skaters from Budapest
Olympic medalists in figure skating
World Figure Skating Championships medalists
European Figure Skating Championships medalists
Jewish Hungarian sportspeople
Medalists at the 1932 Winter Olympics
Medalists at the 1936 Winter Olympics